Paul Harrison (born 1988) is a Jamaican cricketer. He made his first-class debut for Jamaica in the 2017–18 Regional Four Day Competition on 2 November 2017.

References

External links
 

1988 births
Living people
Jamaican cricketers
Jamaica cricketers
Place of birth missing (living people)